Conognathus is a genus of skippers in the family Hesperiidae. It is monotypic, being represented by the single species Conognathus platon.

References
Natural History Museum Lepidoptera genus database

Carcharodini
Hesperiidae genera
Taxa named by Baron Cajetan von Felder
Taxa named by Rudolf Felder